The Fénéon Prize (Prix Fénéon), established in 1949, is awarded annually to a French-language writer and a visual artist no older than 35 years of age. The prize was established by Fanny Fénéon, the widow of French art critic Félix Fénéon. She bequeathed the proceeds from the sale of his art collection to the University of Paris, whose Vice Chancellor chairs the award jury.

Recipients

Art

1950: Mireille Miailhe
1951: Louis Derbré for Buste de Louis Werschürr, Paul Rebeyrolle and Paul Collomb
1952: Jack Ottaviano & Marcel Fiorini
1953: André Cottavoz, Jean Fusaro and Gérard Lanvin
1954: Lucien Fleury, René Laubies and Roger-Edgar Gillet
1955: Huguette Arthur Bertrand
1957: Françoise Salmon, Pierre Parsus and Gabriel Godard
1962: Jean Revol
1963: Bernard Le Quellec
1964: Jean Parsy
1966: Michel Moy
1968: Paul-Henri Friquet
1969: Pierre Gaste
1972: Henri Reiter
1973: Jean-Luc Parant
1976: Bernard Gabriel Lafabrie
1977: Jean-Pierre Vieren
1978: Vincent Rougier
1979: Jean-Jacques Dournon
1981: Mathias Pérez
1983: Marie Morel
1987: Paul Pagk
1994: Pál Breznay
1998: Florent Chopin
2002: Xavier Escriba
2003: Xavier Drong
2007: Thilleli Rahmoun
2008: Étienne Fouchet
2010: Marion Verboom
2011: Franck Masanell
2012: Anne-Charlotte Yver
2013: Félix Pinquier
2014: Claire Chesnier
2015: Julia Gault
2016: Alice Louradour
2017: Raphaëlle Peria
2018: Salomé Fauc
2019: Maxime Biou
2020: Quentin Guichard and Hui Liu

Literature

1949: Michel Cournot for Martinique
1950: Alfred Kern for Le jardin perdu and Celou Arasco for La Cote des malfaisants
1951: Claude Roy for Le poète mineur, Béatrix Beck for Une mort irrégulière and Micheline Peyrebonne for Leur sale pitié.
1952: Michel Vinaver for L'Objecteur
1953: Mohamed Dib for La Grande Maison, Francis Jeanson for Montaigne peint par lui-même and Claude Levy for Une histoire vraie
1954: Jean-Luc Déjean for Les Voleurs de pauvres, Albert Memmi for La Statue de sel and Alain Robbe-Grillet for Les Gommes
1955: Jean David for Les Passes du silence, Marcel Allemann for Les Exploits du Grand Zapata, Robert Droguet for Féminaire and Pierre Oster for Le Champ de mai
1956: Dominique Vazeilles for La Route vers la mer, François Clément for Le Fils désobéissant and Georges Conchon for Les Honneurs de la guerre
1957: Michel Butor for L'Emploi du temps, Michel Breitman for L'Homme aux mouettes, Jacques Bens for Chanson vécue and Laurent La Praye for La Trompette des anges
1958: Jean-François Revel for Pourquoi les philosophes ?, Philippe Sollers for Le Défi and Jacques Cousseau for Le Chien gris
1959: Armand Gatti for Le Poisson noir, Jean Forton for La Cendre aux yeux, Robert Vigneau for Planches d'anatomie and Jean Fanchette for Archipels
1960: Dominique Daguet for Soleil et Lune, Suzanne Martin for Rue des vivants and Yves Velan for Je
1961: Jean Thibaudeau for Cérémonie royale, Jean Laugier for Les Bogues and Michel Deguy for Fragments du cadastre
1962: Jacques Serguine for Les Saints Innocents, Noël Quatrepoint for Journal d'un être humain and Stephen Jourdain for Cette vie m'aime
1963: Jean Gilbert for his novel L'Enfant et le harnais, Marcelin Pleynet for Provisoires amants des nègres and Jean-Pierre Steinbach aka Jean-Philippe Salabreuil for Poèmes de mon cru
1964: Jeanine Segelle for Le Pivert s'envole and Claude Durand for L'Autre vie
1965: Denis Roche for Les Idées centésimales de Miss Elanize, Pierre Feuga for La Galère en bois de rose and Nicolas Genka for Jeanne la pudeur
1966: Claude Fessaguet for Le Bénéfice du doute and Jean Ricardou for his novel La Prise de Constantinople
1967: Didier Martin for Le Déclin des jours and Yves Vequaud for Le Petit Livre avalé
1968: Jacques Roubaud for £
1969: Patrick Modiano for his novel La Place de l'Étoile
1970: Angelo Rinaldi for La Loge du gouverneur
1971: Jean Ristat for Du coup d'Etat en littérature
1972: Claude Faraggi for Le Signe de la bête
1973: Jean-Marc Roberts for Samedi, dimanche et fêtes
1974: Paol Keineg for Lieux communs
1975: Henri Raczymow for La Saisie
1976: Michel Falempin for L'Écrit fait masse
1977: Denis Duparc, pseudonym of Renaud Camus, for Échange
1978: Mathieu Bénézet for L'Imitation
1979: Marc Guyon for Le Principe de solitude
1980: Jean Echenoz for Le Méridien de Greenwich
1981: Jean-Marie Laclavetine for Les Emmurés
1982: Jean-Louis Hue for Le Chat dans tous ses états
1983: Bertrand Visage for Au pays des nains
1984: Gilles Carpentier for Les Manuscrits de la marmotte
1985: Hervé Guibert for Des aveugles
1986: Gilles Quinsat for L'Eclipse
1987: Laurence Guillon for Le Tsar Hérode
1988: Claude Arnaud for Chamfort & Benoît Conort for Pour une île à venir
1989: Éric Holder for Duo forte
1990: Patrick Cahuzac for Parole de singe
1991: Agnès Minazzoli for La Première Ombre
1992: Thierry Laget for Iris
1993: Éric Chevillard for La Nébuleuse du crabe
1994: Anne Grospiron for L'Empyrée
1995: Éric Laurrent for Coup de foudre
1996: Béatrice Leca for Technique du marbre
1997: Linda Lê for Les Trois Parques
1998: Arnaud Oseredczuk for 59 préludes à l'évidence
2000: Laurent Mauvignier for Loin d'eux
2001: Bessora for Les Taches d'encre
2002: Tanguy Viel for L'Absolue Perfection du crime
2003: Clémence Boulouque for Mort d'un silence
2004: Olga Lossky for Requiem pour un clou
2005: Hafid Aggoune for Les Avenirs
2006: Ivan Farron for Les Déménagements inopportuns
2007: Grégoire Polet for Leurs Vies éclatantes
2008: Jean-Baptiste Del Amo for Une éducation libertine
2010: Pauline Klein for Alice Kahn
2011: Justine Augier for En règle avec la nuit
2012: Guillaume Louet for having established, prefaced and annotated the Écrits critiques of Jean José Marchand
2013: Thomas Augais for his work of poetry Vers Baïkal (mitraille)
2014: unawarded
2015: Miguel Bonnefoy for Le voyage d'Octavio
2016: Colombe Boncenne for Comme neige
2017: Fanny Taillandier for Les États et empires du lotissement Grand siècle
2018: Julia Kerninon for Ma dévotion
2019: Isabelle Mayault for Une longue nuit mexicaine
2020:  for Les Corps insurgés

See also
 List of European art awards

References

External links 
 Pris Fénéon on the site of the Académie française
 Prix Fénéon on the site of the Centre national des arts plastiques
 Prix Fénéon de Littérature on Prix-littéraire.net

French literary awards
Visual arts awards
Awards established in 1949
University of Paris
1949 establishments in France